"Broken Heart" is the debut single by British-American synthpop duo Red Flag, released in 1988.

Track listing
12" maxi-single
A1. "Broken Heart" (Extended Remix) (5:41)
A2. "Broken Heart" (U.K. Remix) (5:16)
A3. "Re-Broken" (0:59)
B1. "Broken Heart" (Radio Edit) (3:50)
B2. "Control" (5:30)

Chart position

References

1988 songs
1988 debut singles
Red Flag (band) songs